The 1954–55 Scottish Division B was won by Airdrieonians who, along with second placed Dunfermline Athletic, were promoted to Division One. Brechin City finished bottom.

Table

References

Scottish Football Archive

Scottish Division Two seasons
2
Scot